"I Like to Rock" is a song by Canadian rock band April Wine written by primary lead singer and songwriter Myles Goodwyn. The song appears on the band's eight studio album Harder ... Faster (1979) as the second single. The song features Myles Goodwyn's rough-and-ready vocals over the band's well known combination of hard rock and blues rock.

The song was a moderate success when released in 1980, reaching #75 on the Canadian Hot 100, #86 on the Billboard Hot 100, and #41 on the UK Singles Chart, their highest peak in the UK. It has gained substantial popularity internationally since the 1980s, becoming a mainstay of April Wine's setlist. The song is arguably the band's signature song, and has become a staple of classic rock and album-oriented rock radio stations in both the US and Canada

Content

Song
Like many of the group's other songs, "I Like to Rock" is sung by Myles Goodwyn, accompanied by blues rock electric guitar and hard rock sounds. The final verse of the song includes the main guitar riffs to the Beatles' "Day Tripper" and the Rolling Stones' "(I Can't Get No) Satisfaction" played simultaneously, in homage to these bands.

Lyrics
The lyrics of "I Like to Rock" have Myles Goodwyn (lead singer) sing about his love of rock music, while the chorus says "I like to rock, some like it hot, baby". The lyrics also refer to partying late at night and singing in front of large crowds at concerts.

Music video
The music video for "I Like to Rock" was directed by Brian Greenway, the band's main guitarist (who also directed the music videos for "Just Between You and Me" and "Enough Is Enough"), and features the band playing the song inside a recording studio located in the woods. The same location, Le Studio, would be used in the video for the song "Tom Sawyer" by fellow Canadian rock band Rush, in 1981.

Charts

Accolades

CKKQ-FM "the Q" ranked the song #65 on their list of the "150 Best Canadian Songs of All Time".
Rock Klassics ranked it the 94th greatest Canadian rock song.
The song was placed at #226 on the 500 Greatest Classic Rock Songs compiled by WXKR.
It was ranked #33 on CBC's list of the "50 Greatest Canadian Songs", in 2009.
VH1 ranked the song #93 on their list of the "100 Greatest Rock Songs".

In popular culture

"I Like to Rock" was used in the films Flower & Garnet, Gutterballs, High Life, and Drive Angry, as well as S1 E6 of Being Erica titled "Something Wrong With...", as well as the 2010 comedy television special Kids in the Hall: Death Comes to Town.

References

1979 songs
1980 singles
April Wine songs
Songs written by Myles Goodwyn
Song recordings produced by Mike Stone (record producer)
Aquarius Records (Canada) singles
Capitol Records singles